Jacob Marinoff (3 December 1869 – 27 October 1964) was a Russian-born American Yiddish publisher and author. He was one of the founders of New York satirical weekly Der Groyser Kundes ("The Big Stick"). He published three volumes of verse, and co-edited a satire collection.

Early life 
Marinoff was born in Russia on 3 December 1869, where he received a traditional Jewish education. He arrived in England in 1891, and immigrated to the United States two years later.

Jewish Consumptive Relief Society 
Marinoff was part of the early fundraising efforts of the Jewish Consumptives' Relief Society (JCRS), which ran a tuberculosis sanatorium in Colorado. While based in New York, he collected money from Jewish fraternal orders, unions, ladies' auxiliaries, and more. Marinoff was also involved in The Sanatorium, a journal from the JCRS Press and Propaganda Committee that included reports from the JCRS, medical advice, human interest stories, poetry, and literature. One copy of The Sanatorium lists Marinoff as "Superintendent."

Humor and poetry 
Marinoff was one of the founders of Yiddish satirical weeklyThe Big Stick in 1909, along with Joseph Tunkel. He took over the magazine entirely after Tunkel moved to Warsaw, and continued to run it until the magazine folded in 1927.

Beyond The Big Stick, Marinoff was the editor of “Humor and Satire,” a three-volume collection published in 1912. He wrote three volumes of poetry: “Shpil un Kamp” (“Play and Fight”) in 1938; and “Mir Veln Zayn” (“We Will Be”) and “Shtark un Munter” (“Strong and Courageous”) 1947.

Personal life 
Marinoff's sister was actress Fania Marinoff, and his brother-in-law was Harlem Renaissance novelist Carl Van Vechten. He died on 27 October 1964 at age 94 at Workmen's Circle Home for the Aged in the Bronx.

References 

1869 births
1964 deaths
Emigrants from the Russian Empire to the United States
20th-century publishers (people)
Jewish American poets
Russian Jews
American publishers (people)
20th-century American poets
American male poets
20th-century American male writers
American satirists
American magazine founders
Writers from New York City
American writers of Russian descent
Jewish Russian writers
American people of Russian-Jewish descent
Yiddish-language satirists
Yiddish-language poets